Cities Area Transit (CAT) is the public transportation system in the neighboring cities of Grand Forks, North Dakota and East Grand Forks, Minnesota. The scheduled transit bus routes are operated by the city of Grand Forks and service is provided to East Grand Forks through a cost-sharing agreement.  Paratransit for those who are unable to use the regular bus under the ADA, and a service for seniors, are provided under contract by Grand Forks Taxi.

History
Public transportation in Grand Forks was originally provided by the Grand Forks Street Railway Company which operated five street car lines that connected Downtown Grand Forks with the University of North Dakota campus, the Grand Forks County fairgrounds, the neighborhoods of Lincoln Park and Riverside Park, and the community of East Grand Forks, Minnesota. The service completely switched over to buses on July 1, 1934.

Routes
Routes generally run from 6:00am to 10:00pm Monday-Friday, and 8:00am to 10:00pm on Saturday (No service is offered Sundays or federal holidays). A Night route covers the city from approximately 5:55pm to 10:00pm, with service finishing for the night at 10:00pm. Routes operate once per hour unless otherwise noted. The #4 and #6 offer coordinated service once every 30 minutes along the University Avenue corridor (the individual branches operate once per hour). Additionally, the #12 and #13 complement each other, with the #12 operating eastbound, and becoming a westbound #13 on the return trip. A similar arrangement exists with the #8 and #9. The #10 and #11 offer 2 buses per hour between the central portion of East Grand Forks, and the Metro Transit Center. The #1 and #2 do not overlap, but interline at the Metro Transit Center.

Most routes pass by the Metro Transit Center (which is the location of the headquarters), at 450 Kittson Avenue, with the exception of the #8/9 and #12/13.

Scheduled bus route details are listed below:

Fares
The Cities Area Transit fares are:

Downtown Transfer Station
The Downtown Transfer Station is located at 450 Kittson Avenue and serves as the primary hub for Cities Area Transit. The hub serves 8 routes, as well as providing intercity bus service through Jefferson Lines.

Fixed Route Ridership

The ridership and service statistics shown here are of fixed route services only and do not include demand response. Per capita statistics are based on the Grand Forks urbanized area as reported in NTD data. Starting in 2011, 2010 census numbers replace the 2000 census numbers to calculate per capita statistics.

See also
 List of bus transit systems in the United States
 MATBUS
 Minot City Transit

References

External links
Cities Area Transit website
History of public transportation in Grand Forks

Greater Grand Forks
Bus transportation in North Dakota
Bus transportation in Minnesota
Transportation in Grand Forks County, North Dakota
Transportation in Polk County, Minnesota